StressFest is the seventh studio album by the guitarist Steve Morse, released in April 1996 by High Street Records.

Track listing

Personnel
Steve Morse – guitar, mixing, production
Van Romaine – drums, percussion
Dave LaRue – bass, production
Al Dowson – engineering
Paul Wright – mixing
Darren Schneider – mixing (tracks 4, 6, 9)
Greg Rike – mixing (tracks 4, 6, 9)
Mike Fuller – mastering
Rod Fuller – mastering

References

Steve Morse albums
1996 albums